Redfin Corporation, based in Seattle, operates a residential real estate brokerage in 95 markets in the United States and Canada and in other markets via partner/referral agents. Its business model includes charging home sellers below-average fees of 1.5% of the sales price of a property, in addition to fees to the buyer's agent (usually 2.5% of the sales price of a property). In 2021, the company had a 1.17% market share in the United States by value. The company name is an anagram of the words "finder" and "friend".

History
Redfin was founded in 2004 by David Eraker, Michael Dougherty, and David Selinger. Eraker had dropped out of medical school at the University of Washington for a career in software design and Dougherty received degrees in electrical engineering and international studies from Yale University. David Selinger, an alumnus of Stanford University who had previously led the research and development arm of Amazon's data mining and personalization team, joined Redfin as the third founder and CTO. Selinger helped build Redfin's mapping and real estate data analytics engine.

Redfin's website showed available homes on a map, which was a new concept at the time.

In January 2006, Redfin raised a $1.25 million Series A round from Madrona Venture Group and named Glenn Kelman as CEO.

In May 2006, Redfin raised $8 million in Series B funding from Vulcan Inc., the investment arm of Microsoft co-founder Paul Allen.

In May 2007, Redfin was fined $50,000 by the Northwest Multiple Listing Service, and was forced to shut down reviews of homes on the market on its website, prohibited under multiple listing service rules.

In July 2007, Redfin raised $12 million from Draper Fisher Jurvetson.

In November 2009, Redfin raised $10 million from Greylock Partners.

In May 2010, Redfin won the Seattle 2.0 award for "Best Startup".

Redfin began an automatic agent rating system in 2012; after it drew criticism for using inaccurate data, the system was discontinued.

In November 2013, Redfin raised $50 million in a mezzanine round led by T. Rowe Price and Tiger Management, bringing its total venture funding to slightly over $96 million.

In October 2014, Redfin acquired Walk Score.

In December 2014, Redfin raised $70.9 million from Wellington Management, Glynn Capital Management, Brothers Brook, Annox Capital Management, and previous investors Tiger Global Management and T. Rowe Price.

In June 2017, the company began buying and selling houses directly under the brand Redfin Now.

On July 28, 2017, Redfin became a public company via an initial public offering, raising $138 million.

In June 2019, Redfin began offering buyers the opportunity to submit offers on homes listed by Redfin's selling agents without using a buyer's agent, saving sellers commissions and possibly making their offers more attractive.

In July 2019, Redfin partnered with Opendoor, an online real estate company, whereby visitors to the Redfin website can request an offer to buy their houses from Opendoor.

In November 2020, a class-action lawsuit by several fair housing organizations accused Redfin of violating the Fair Housing Act by offering fewer services to homebuyers and sellers in minority communities and not offering to sell lower-priced homes because of the lower profits on such sales. In 2022, the company paid $4 million to settle the lawsuit, changed its policies, and implemented a new internal monitoring system.

On April 9, 2021, Redfin acquired RentPath, which owns Apartment Guide, Rent.com, Lovely, and Rentals.com, for $608 million.

In December 2021, Redfin announced it would no longer include neighborhood crime data in search results due to "inaccuracy" in Federal Bureau of Investigation crime data, and because Bureau of Justice Statistics data was "troubling" because "people reporting crimes were more likely to describe their offender as young, male, and Black".

In January 2022, Redfin acquired Bay Equity Home Loans, a mortgage lending operation based in California with operations in 42 states, for $137.8 million.

In June 2022, the company announced layoffs of 8% of its staff amid a downturn in the housing market.

Awards
In July 2006, Inman News awarded Redfin the Innovator Award for the Most Innovative Business Model.

In October 2012, Redfin was named one of The DIGITAL 100: World's Most Valuable Private Tech Companies by Business Insider.

In July 2013, Inman News awarded Redfin an award for "Most Innovative Brokerage or Franchise".

In June 2014, Seattle Business magazine recognized Redfin as the best company to work for in Seattle in the Large Companies category.

Redfin was named the one of the top tech companies to work for in Seattle by Hired.com.

See also
 National Association of Realtors
 List of online real estate databases

References

External links
 

Real estate companies established in 2004
2004 establishments in Washington (state)
American companies established in 2004
Companies based in Seattle
Online real estate databases
Real estate services companies of the United States
Companies listed on the Nasdaq
2017 initial public offerings